The Great Plains Athletic Conference (GPAC) is a college athletic conference affiliated with the National Association of Intercollegiate Athletics (NAIA). Member institutions are located in Iowa, Nebraska, North Dakota, and South Dakota. The conference was founded in 1969 as the Nebraska Intercollegiate Athletic Conference (NIAC), later becoming the Nebraska–Iowa Athletic Conference (1992) before being renamed the Great Plains Athletic Conference (2000).

History

The Great Plains Athletic Conference was founded on September 22, 1969, as the Nebraska Intercollegiate Athletic Conference (NIAC). The first president of the conference was Art Nicolia (NWU) while Glen Hinkle (Doane) was the vice president and Roger Olsen (Dana) was the secretary/treasure. Jack Anderson (NWU) was named the first publicist on February 28, 1970. The six charter members were Concordia University, Dana College, Doane University, Hastings College, Midland University, and Nebraska Wesleyan University. With the addition of Northwestern College in 1992, the NIAC was renamed the Nebraska–Iowa Athletic Conference. The NIAC became the Great Plains Athletic Conference in 2000 with the addition of Dakota Wesleyan University, Dordt University, Mount Marty University, and the University of Sioux Falls. Later, Briar Cliff University and Morningside University joined the GPAC in 2002 and 2003 respectively. The College of Saint Mary, a women's only institution, joined in 2015. In 2018, University of Jamestown joined the conference as a full-member, while Presentation College joined the conference as an associate member. All former members of the NIAC remain affiliated with the GPAC except for Dana College, which closed in 2010, the University of Sioux Falls, which left the conference in 2011, and Nebraska Wesleyan University, which left the conference in 2016. Paul Clark was the commissioner of the GPAC when it formed in 2000. Corey Westra in Sioux City, Iowa, is the current commissioner of the league.

Chronological timeline
 1969 – On September 22, 1969, the Great Plains Athletic Conference (GPAC) was founded as the Nebraska Intercollegiate Athletic Conference (NIAC). Charter members included Concordia Teachers College (now Concordia University of Nebraska), Dana College, Doane College (now Doane University), Hastings College, Midland Lutheran College (now Midland University) and Nebraska Wesleyan University, effective beginning the 1969–70 academic year.
 1992 – Northwestern College of Iowa joined the NIAC. Therefore, the NIAC has been rebranded as the Nebraska-Iowa Athletic Conference (NIAC), effective in the 1992–93 academic year.
 2000 – Dakota Wesleyan University, Dordt College (now Dordt University), Mount Marty College (now Mount Marty University) and the University of Sioux Falls joined the NIAC. Therefore, the NIAC has been rebranded as the Great Plains Athletic Conference (GPAC), effective in the 2000–01 academic year.
 2002 – Briar Cliff College (now Briar Cliff University) joined the GPAC, effective in the 2002–03 academic year.
 2003 – Morningside College (now Morningside University) joined the GPAC, effective in the 2003–04 academic year.
 2010 – Dana left the GPAC as the school announced that it would close, effective after the 2009–10 academic year.
 2011 – Sioux Falls left the GPAC and the NAIA for the Division II ranks of the National Collegiate Athletic Association (NCAA) as an NCAA D-II Independent (which would later join the Northern Sun Intercollegiate Conference (NSIC), effective beginning the 2012–13 academic year), effective after the 2010–11 academic year.
 2015 – The College of Saint Mary joined the GPAC, effective in the 2015–16 academic year.
 2016 – Nebraska Wesleyan left the GPAC and the NAIA to fully align in the NCAA Division III ranks (during that time, they held dual membership with both the NAIA and the NCAA), primarily competing as a member of the Iowa Intercollegiate Athletic Conference (IIAC; now known as the American Rivers Conference), effective after the 2015–16 academic year.
 2018 – The University of Jamestown joined the GPAC, effective in the 2018–19 academic year.
 2018 – Presentation College joined the GPAC as an affiliate member for men's and women's soccer, effective in the 2018 fall season (2018–19 academic year).
 2020 – Central Christian College of Kansas and Ottawa University joined the GPAC as affiliate members for men's volleyball, effective in the 2021 fall season (2020–21 academic year).
 2021 – Kansas Wesleyan University joined the GPAC as an affiliate member for men's volleyball, effective in the 2022 fall season (2021–22 academic year).

Member schools

Current members
The GPAC currently has 12 full members, all are private schools:

Notes

Associate members
The GPAC currently has four associate members, all are private schools:

Notes

Former members
The GPAC had three former full members, all were private schools:

Notes

Membership timeline

Sponsored sports

Men's sponsored sports by school

Presentation College is an associate member

Women's sponsored sports by school

Presentation College is an associate member

Notes

References

External links

 
2000 establishments in the United States
College sports in South Dakota
College sports in Iowa
College sports in Nebraska